Risinghoe Castle, sometimes known as Goldington Castle, is a 20-foot mound, located in the former village of Goldington, a parish in the hundred of Barford, in the county of Bedfordshire, England. The village of Goldington has now been incorporated into the town of Bedford, and the castle is now officially is located in Newnham ward.  The mound is located on the north side of the River Ouse, three miles east of Bedford Castle and a mile west of Renhold Castle

Details

Controversy exists over the original purpose of the earthwork, particularly whether it was actually part of a castle site.  Conventional wisdom states Risinghoe Castle was a timber Motte-and-bailey castle built sometime after the Norman Invasion of 1066.  It is referred to as having been the property of Hugh de Beauchamp, the chief landowner in Goldington in 1086. The castle is mentioned as already being old by the end of the 12th century.  It was probably obtained by Warden Abbey with the grange of Risinghoe and Puttenhoe Manor, with which it was conferred on Sir John Gostwick at the Dissolution (1538–1541), afterwards passing, with the rest of their property in Goldington, to John Russell, Duke of Bedford.

There is no surviving physical evidence of a bailey, nor other elements of a castle, although this may be due to extensive clay extraction on the site in Victorian times.  A number of authors have stated that the mound was excavated in 1943, however no primary sources for the excavation appear to exist, and there is no mention of it in the report of the 1943 annual meeting of the Bedfordshire Natural History and Archaeological Society.  An alternative version, stated by local residents, is that the mound was penetrated for the construction of an air raid shelter in 1940 and nothing was found.  If the second version of events is correct, then no professional excavation has ever taken place.

Beauchamp Wadmore, in his 1920 book The Earthworks of Bedfordshire, casts further doubts on the status as a castle site.  Wadmore's researches point to the mound being erected to commemorate a 9th-century victory over the Danes associated with nearby Gannock Castle.  Wadmore also states that, prior to the damage of the site for clay extraction, a second smaller mound existed.  However, an early Ordnance Survey map names it as a castle site.

Risinghoe Castle is located on private property belonging to a local company and is not open to the public.  However, the site can be viewed from a distance from the nearby road.

See also
Castles in Great Britain and Ireland
List of castles in England

References
British History Online
The Earthworks of Bedfordshire, Beauchamp Wadmore, Bedfordshire Standard, 1920
Bedfordshire Archaeologists Activities, The Bedfordshire Times, 15 October 1943

Buildings and structures in Bedford
Ruins in Bedfordshire
Castles in Bedfordshire